Shantilal Shah was an Indian politician, elected to the Lok Sabha, the lower house of the Parliament of India as a member of the Indian National Congress. He received his education at Elphinstone College and Gujarat College.

References

External links
Official biographical sketch in Parliament of India website

India MPs 1967–1970
Lok Sabha members from Maharashtra
1898 births
People from Mumbai Suburban district
Year of death missing